Rhyothemis variegata, known as the common picture wing or variegated flutterer, is a species of dragonfly of the family Libellulidae, found in South Asia.

Description and habitat

It is a medium-sized dark bodied dragonfly with colorful wings tinted with pale yellow. There are a few black spots on the apices and nodes of the fore-wings. There is a large patch in the base of the hind-wings, marked with black and golden yellow. In females, the apical half of the fore-wings are transparent; basal half tinted with golden-yellow with black marks. The apical ends of the hind-wings are transparent; rest of wings marked with golden-yellow and black. 

It breeds in marshes, ponds and paddy fields. They appear to have weak flight and can easily be mistaken for butterflies.

Image gallery

See also
 List of odonates of Sri Lanka
 List of odonates of India
 List of odonata of Kerala

References

External links

Libellulidae
Insects of Asia
Insects described in 1763
Taxa named by Carl Linnaeus